The Edinburgh Capitals (SNL) were an ice hockey team based in Edinburgh, Scotland.  Formed in 1998, they were the 'B' team for the Elite League Capitals with whom they shared their name.  The Edinburgh Capitals (SNL) played in the Scottish National League which is considered a third tier league in the United Kingdom equivalent to the equivalent to the NIHL.  Certain players also ice for or have iced for their Elite League counterparts. 

The Captain for the 2017–18 season was Joel Gautschi.  His assistants were the two veterans, Ross Hay and Gary Hughes.

The team folded in 2018 when the Elite League Capitals did.

Team Roster

Net Minders
 

Defense 

  

Forwards

History

2001–02 SNL League Champions 
2002–03 SNL League Champions 
2012–13 SNL Scottish Cup Winners
2013–14 SNL League Champions  
2013–14 SNL Playoff Champions 
2013–14 SNL Scottish Cup Winners
2014–15 SNL Autumn Cup Winners
2014–15 SNL Scottish Cup Winners

Team Season Stats

External links

Scottish Ice Hockey Website
Edinburgh Capitals Supporters Club Website
Murrayfield Junior Ice Hockey Club

Ice hockey teams in Scotland
1998 establishments in Scotland
Ice hockey clubs established in 1998
Sports teams in Edinburgh
Ice hockey clubs disestablished in 2018
2018 disestablishments in Scotland